The six Naval Sea Systems Command Program Executive Offices (PEOs) are responsible for the development and acquisition of naval platforms and weapons systems. Their mission is to develop, acquire, field and sustain affordable and integrated state of the art equipment for the Navy and Marine Corps. 

The Naval Sea Systems Command is organizationally aligned to the Chief of Naval Operations.  As part of its mission, NAVSEA provides support, manpower, resources, and facilities to its aligned Program Executive Offices (PEOs).  The Program Executive Offices are responsible for the execution of major defense acquisition programs.  The PEOs are organizationally aligned to the Assistant Secretary of the Navy for Research, Development and Acquisition (ASN(RDA)).  The Naval Sea Systems Command PEOs operate under NAVSEA policies and procedures.

There are six Naval Sea Systems Command Program Executive Offices.

Program Executive Office Aircraft Carriers (PEO Carriers) 

PEO (Carriers) provides the Navy with design, construction and delivery, and life-cycle support of all aircraft carriers and the integration of systems into aircraft carriers.  

The Program Executive Officer for PEO (Carriers) is Rear Admiral James P. Downey, USN, a post which he assumed in June 2019.

PEO (Carriers) comprises three major program offices:

 PMS 312: In-Service Aircraft Carrier Program
 PMS 378: CVN 78 Class Program
 PMS 379: CVN 79/80 Program

Program Executive Office Columbia (PEO Columbia) 
PEO (Columbia) provides the Navy with design, construction, and delivery of the Columbia-class fleet ballistic missile submarine.

The Program Executive Officer for PEO (Columbia) is Rear Admiral Scott Pappano, USN, a post which he assumed in March 2019.

PEO (Columbia) comprises one major program office:

 PMS 397: COLUMBIA Class Program Office

Program Executive Office Integrated Warfare Systems (PEO IWS) 
PEO (IWS) provides the Navy with design, construction, and delivery of combat systems for surface ships.

The Program Executive Officer for PEO (IWS) is Rear Admiral Elizabeth Okano, USN, a post which she assumed in June 2020.

PEO (IWS) comprises five integrated combat systems major program offices, and seven product major program offices:

 Integrated combat systems major program offices
 IWS 1.0: AEGIS Program
 IWS 4.0: International Programs & Foreign Military Sales (FMS) Program
 IWS 8.0: Mine, Amphibious, Auxiliary, and Command (MAAC) System Integration Program
 IWS 9.0: Zumwalt Integrated Combat System Program
 IWS 10.0: Ship Self Defense System (SSDS) Program

 Product major program offices
 IWS 2.0: Above Water Sensors and Lasers Program
 IWS 3.0: Surface Ship Weapons Program
 IWS 5.0: Undersea Systems Program
 IWS 6.0: Command and Control Program
 IWS 11.0: Terminal Defense Systems Program
 IWS 12.0: NATO Seasparrow Program
 IWS ?.?: Systems of Systems Engineering / Integrated Fire (SoS/IF) Program

Program Executive Office Ships (PEO Ships) 
PEO (Ships) provides the Navy with acquisition and complete life-cycle support for all non-nuclear surface ships.

The Program Executive Officer for PEO (Ships) is Rear Admiral Tom J. Anderson, USN, a post which he assumed in March 2019.

PEO (Ships) comprises seven major program offices:

 PMS 300: U.S. Navy and Foreign Military Sales (FMS) Boats and Craft
 PMS 317: LPD 17 Program
 PMS 320: Electric Ships Office (ESO)
 PMS 325: Support Ships, Boats & Craft Program
 PMS 373: Polar Security Cutter Program
 PMS 377: Amphibious Warfare Program
 PMS 385: Strategic & Theater Sealift Program
 PMS 400D: DDG 51 Program - Arleigh Burke class destroyer 
 PMS 500: DDG 1000 Program - Zumwalt class destroyer

Program Executive Office Submarines (PEO Submarines) 

PEO (Submarines) provides the Navy with the design, construction, delivery, and conversion of submarines and advanced undersea and anti-submarine systems.

The Program Executive Officer for PEO (Submarines) is Rear Admiral David A. Goggins, USN, a post which he assumed in August 2018.

PEO (Submarines) comprises seven major program offices:

 PMS 401: Submarine Acoustic Systems Program
 PMS 404: Undersea Weapons Program
 PMS 415: Undersea Defensive Warfare Systems Program
 PMS 425: Submarine Combat and Weapons Control Program
 PMS 435: Submarine Electromagnetic Systems Program
 PMS 450: VIRGINIA Class Program
 PMS 485: Maritime Surveillance Systems Program

Program Executive Office Unmanned and Small Combatants (PEO USC) 

PEO (USC) provides the Navy with the design, development, build, maintenance and modernization of unmanned maritime systems, mine warfare systems and small surface combatants. This PEO was established in March 2018 with the renaming of the Program Executive Office Littoral Combat Ship (PEO LCS) as Program Executive Office, Unmanned and Small Combatants (PEO USC).

The Program Executive Officer for PEO (USC) is Rear Admiral Casey Moton, USN, a post which he assumed in August 2018.

PEO (USC) comprises seven major program offices:

 PMS 340: Naval Special Warfare Program
 PMS 406: Unmanned Maritime Systems Program
 PMS 420: LCS Mission Modules Program
 PMS 495: Mine Warfare Systems Program
 PMS 501: Littoral Combat Ships Program
 PMS 505: LCS Fleet Introduction and Sustainment Program
 PMS 515: Frigate Program
 PMS 525: International Small Combatants/LCS Program

See also 
Marine Corps Systems Command
Naval Air Systems Command
Naval Facilities Engineering Command
Naval Information Warfare Systems Command
Naval Sea Systems Command
Naval Supply Systems Command

Footnotes

Shore commands of the United States Navy